Delhi Integrated Multi-Modal Transit System (DIMTS) Limited is transport consultancy and infrastructure development company. It is a joint venture company with equal equity of the Government of National Capital Territory of Delhi (GNCTD) and the IDFC Foundation (a not-for-profit initiative of Infrastructure Development Finance Company Limited).

Incorporation
DIMTS was organized in 2006 to prepare, plan, design and implement complex transport related projects in Delhi. In 2007, it was incorporated and became an equal equity joint venture between Government of National Capital Territory of Delhi (GNCTD) and the IDFC Foundation. The company has equal representation from both GNCTD and IDFC in its Board.

Memberships & Partnerships
DIMTS is a member of the Transportation Research & Injury Prevention Programme (TRIPP), IIT Delhi, the 
International Association of Public Transport (UITP), the Transport Research Laboratory (TRL), United Kingdom, Indian Railways, the Consulting Engineers Association of India, and the Open Standard for Public Transport (OSPT™) Alliance.

Key Projects

Detailed Project Report (DPR) for seven BRT corridors in Delhi

DPR for Regional Rapid Transit System for two corridors - Panipat-Sonepat-Delhi (111 km) & Meerut-Ghaziabad-Delhi (92 km)

Route Rationalization of all the bus routes in Delhi through a DPR

Technical and financial feasibility study for MMRDA Mumbai 

DPR for Bengaluru International Airport Rail Link Limited

Feasibility study for Personal Rapid Transit in Delhi

Comprehensive Mobility Plans (CMP) for Bhopal, Dehradun, Mussoorie, Rohtak and Thoottukudi (Tamil Nadu)

Implementation of GPRS-based ETM (Electronic Ticketing Machines) based ticketing in Delhi

Implementation, operation & management of Intelligent Signalling System on Ambedkar Nagar-Delhi Gate BRT Corridor

Implementation of automatic vehicle location and tracking system for the entire public transit bus fleet in Delhi

Engineering studies for re-development/development of ISBTs at Kashmere Gate, Sarai Kale Khan, Anand Vihar and Dwarka

Design and construction of depot facilities

Construction of FOBs/subways/bus shelters at several locations in Delhi

Detailed project report and project management consultancy for rail line implementation
 
Detailed Design Engineering: bridges & track

Pre-feasibility report for railway siding

Restoration and repair work of 186 signalized intersections and up-gradation of Control Room with remote monitoring for Ahmedabad Municipal Corporation

Consultancy for design, specifications & estimate of Highway Traffic Management System for Noida-Greater Noida Gautam Buddha Expressway

Operation and maintenance of SCOT & CCTV based Intelligent Signalling System on BRT corridor, Delhi

Not-for-profit Initiatives

Delhi Transit Bus Info mobile application– It lets public find out the estimated arrival time of the buses at a bus stop. It also gives information on the bus routes and bus stops in Delhi.

TellTail Security mobile application – the application can help the individuals reach out to their friends and family in emergency situations on the press of a button. The application allows the user to be tracked using the GPS in a vehicle or the user's phone. When in trouble, the user through this application can send security alert to her important contacts and seek help. It also provides visual tracking information of the user on the map to the concerned contacts.

Cycle Stations at the BRT corridor to promote cycling amongst the public

Cycle rallies at the BRT corridor to promote concept of cycling amongst the public.

References

Transport in Delhi